is an anime television series based on a series of books published in the 1910s and 1920s by Thornton W. Burgess which ran on the Japanese network Fuji Television from 7 January 1973 to 30 December 1973. It consists of 52 episodes and was produced by the animation studio Zuiyo Eizo along with Mushi Production as part of the Calpis Comic Theater (later known as World Masterpiece Theater).

The series has been aired in many countries outside Japan, such as Italy (on TMC), Germany (Bayerischer Rundfunk), Spain (TVE), Romania (TVR 1), Portugal (RTP), Venezuela (VTV), the United Kingdom (ITV / Channel 4), Canada (TVOntario, Knowledge Network and CBLFT-DT, dubbed in both English and French), Saudi Arabia (Saudi 2), Australia (Network Ten), Ireland (Raidió Teilifís Éireann), Israel (Channel 2 dubbed in Hebrew), the Emirates (Dubai 33), Nigeria (NTA), Cyprus (METV), New Zealand (TV One), Brazil (SBT), the Netherlands (TROS), Malaysia (Network Two), Singapore (Mediacorp Channel 5), Indonesia (RCTI / SCTV), South Africa (SABC2), Namibia (SWABC, back when it was known as South West Africa at the time), Hong Kong (both ATV and TVB) and Trinidad and Tobago (TTT).

The release of the series into Canada was done through ZIV International in 1978. There was a second English dub under the title Friends of the Green Forest which aired on the TVOKids on TVOntario in the 1990s.

In the United Kingdom, the original transmission of the series as aforementioned on the ITV network was cut short, with only the first 30 episodes being broadcast in 1982, because the series was dropped due to the introduction of the Childrens ITV service in January 1983 taking over the series' former timeslot. Some of the other episodes were then later subsequently broadcast sporadically in the UK on the "Early Morning" weekend segment on Channel 4 in the early 1990s

Synopsis
The series consists of the adventures of Johnny (or: Rocky), a woodchuck, and his mate Polly in the Green Forest. They make a lot of friends among their neighbours, and everyone works together to avoid the attacks of the different predators that put them in danger, such as man, the weasel, and the fox.

Characters
 Johnny Chuck, a woodchuck, sometimes called Rocky
 Polly Chuck
 Peter Rabbit
 Uncle Billy Possum
 Chatterer the Red Squirrel
 Bobby Raccoon, he wears pants and suspenders
 Reddy the Fox
 Sammy Jay, a blue jay
 Grandfather frog 
 Old man toad 
 Buster the bear, a black bear
 Red tail hawk
 Harry Mink (called Billy in the books)
 Jimmy Skunk
 Tom, Farmer Brown's son
 Bowser the hound
 Joe Otter
 Paddy Beaver
 Danny Meadowmouse

Episodes

Music
 Opening Theme (Japanese version): Midori no Hidamari by Micchī (Mitsuko Horie) and Chatterers

In popular culture
In the 2014 anime Shirobako, protagonist Aoi Miyamori states that her favorite anime is "Andes Hedgehog Mountain Chucky", which features a predominantly animal cast and is inspired by Fables of the Green Forest.

References

Notes
Jonathan Winters will provide all the off-camera voices for "Fables of the Green Forest," a new children's animated cartoon series. Simpson's Leader-Times, Friday, 23 May 1975, p. 11

External links
 
 
 Fables of the Green Forest Series intro

1973 anime television series debuts
1973 Japanese television series debuts
1973 Japanese television series endings
Animated television series about foxes
Animated television series about squirrels
Bandai Visual
Fuji TV original programming
Mushi Production
TVO original programming
World Masterpiece Theater series